Francine is an indie rock band from Boston, Massachusetts, USA.

History
Francine was founded by Clayton Scoble, who previously performed with Til Tuesday and Aimee Mann, and was a member of Poundcake and Colortone. He assembled the group towards the end of 1997 and soon after self-released a few solo demo tapes. The newly-formed band then released an EP and a full-length album on the Massachusetts indie label Q Division Records. A second album followed in 2003. The group received positive reviews, but did not tour nationally behind the album. In 2006, the group released a third album, entitled Airshow.

The Francine song, "Albany Brownout", was used by Fox network's series The O.C. in January, on episode 3.11, "The Safe Harbor".

Francine has appeared on various tribute recordings, including one to Kim Deal and one to the dBs.

Discography
Pop Warner EP (Q Division Records, 2000)
Forty on a Fall Day (Q Division, 2000)
28 Plastic Blue Versions of Endings Without You (Q Division, 2003)
Airshow (Q Division, 2006)
When We Were Loud (self-released, 2018)

References

Musical groups from Boston
Musical groups established in 1997
Indie rock musical groups from Massachusetts